The 1988–89 Hartford Whalers season saw the team finish in fourth place in the Adams Division with a record of 37 wins, 38 losses, and 5 ties for 79 points. They were swept by the Montreal Canadiens in four straight games in the Division Semi-finals.

Off-season
On June 11, 1988, the 1988 NHL Entry Draft was held at the Montreal Forum in Montreal, Quebec. With their first round draft pick, the Whalers selected left winger Chris Govedaris from the Toronto Marlboros of the Ontario Hockey League. Govedaris scored 42 goals and 80 points in 69 games with the Marlboros during the 1987-88 season. With their second round selection, Hartford selected Barry Richter from the Culver Military Academy, where he scored 24 goals and 53 points in 35 games.

At the 1988 NHL Supplemental Draft, the Whalers selected Todd Krygier from the University of Connecticut. In 27 games with the Huskies, Krygier scored 32 goals and 71 points to lead the team in scoring. Following his season with Connecticut, Krygier signed with the New Haven Nighthawks of the American Hockey League, where he scored a goal and six points in 13 games during the 1987-88 season.

The Whalers signed Bob Bodak as a free agent on July 1. Bobak appeared in three games with the Calgary Flames during the 1987-88, earning no points and 22 penalty minutes. He played a majority of the season with the Salt Lake Golden Eagles of the IHL, where in 44 games, Bobak scored 12 goals and 22 points.

On July 6, the Whalers acquired Grant Jennings and Ed Kastelic from the Washington Capitals in exchange for Neil Sheehy and Mike Millar. Jennings appeared in one post-season game with the Capitals, earning no points. He spent the rest of the season with the Binghamton Whalers of the American Hockey League, where he scored two goals and 14 points in 56 games during the 1987-88. Kastelic scored one goal in 35 games with the Capitals during the 1987-88 season.

On August 3, Hartford signed free agent Al Tuer. Tuer appeared in six games with the Minnesota North Stars during the 1987-88 season, scoring one goal. In 68 games with the Kalamazoo Wings of the IHL, Tuer scored two goals and 17 points, while racking up 303 penalty minutes. The Whalers also signed Larry Trader, who scored two goals and six points in 30 games with the Montreal Canadiens during 1987-88.

At the waiver draft held on October 3, the Whalers lost Stew Gavin and Tom Martin to the Minnesota North Stars.

Draft picks

Hartford's selections at the 1988 NHL Entry Draft:

Regular season

The Whalers finished the regular season with the fewest short-handed goals scored (3) and the most short-handed goals allowed (18).

Final standings

Schedule and results

Playoffs

Division semi-finals
Hartford Whalers vs. Montreal Canadiens

Montreal wins best-of-seven series 4 games to 0

Player statistics

Forwards
Note: GP= Games played; G= Goals; AST= Assists; PTS = Points; PIM = Points

Defensemen
Note: GP= Games played; G= Goals; AST= Assists; PTS = Points; PIM = Points

Goaltending
Note: GP= Games played; W= Wins; L= Losses; T = Ties; SO = Shutouts; GAA = Goals Against

Awards and records

 Peter Sidorkiewicz, Goaltender, NHL First All-Rookie Team

Transactions
The Whalers were involved in the following transactions during the 1988–89 season.

Trades

Waivers

Free agents

Farm teams

References

Hartford Whalers seasons
Hart
Hart
Hartford
Hartford